Sanda, formerly Sanshou, also known as Chinese boxing or Chinese kickboxing, is the official Chinese kickboxing full-contact combat sport. Sanda is a fighting system which was originally developed by the Chinese military based upon the study and practices of traditional kung fu and modern combat fighting techniques; it combines boxing and full-contact kickboxing, which includes close range and rapid successive punches and kicks, with wrestling, takedowns, throws, sweeps, kick catches, and in some competitions, even elbow and knee strikes.

As part of the development of sport wushu by the Chinese government, a standard curriculum for Sanda was developed. It is to this standard curriculum that the term Wushu Sanda is usually applied. Sanda may also involve techniques from any other fighting style depending on the teacher's mode of instruction.

History
Sanda's competitive history is rooted in barehanded elevated arena or Lei Tai fights in which no rules were observed. However, Sanda as a competitive event developed in the military as these bouts were commonly held between the soldiers to test and practice barehanded martial skills, ability and techniques. Rules were developed and the use of protective gloves etc. was adopted. It was originally used by the Kuomintang at the first modern military academy in Whampoa in the 1920s. Later it was also adopted as a method by the People's Liberation Army of China. Sanda's curriculum was developed with reference to traditional Chinese martial arts. This general Wushu Sanda curriculum varies in its different forms, as the Chinese government developed a version for civilians for self-defense and as a sport.

Curriculum
The generalized modern curriculum practiced in modern wushu schools is composed of different traditional martial arts fighting styles from China and Western Boxing, but mainly based on scientific efficiency. Wushu Sanda is composed of Chinese martial arts applications including most aspects of combat including striking and grappling, however when Wushu Sanda was developed as a sport, restrictions were made for safety reasons as well as to promote it as a non-violent sport. Examples of such restrictions included no blows delivered to the back of the head, throat, spine or groin and the discontinuation of the combat when any of the fighters fall to the ground. However many schools, whether traditional or modern, practice it as an all-round martial arts system with no restrictions, only adapting their training in relation to competition rules prior to the event. Sanda tournaments are one of the two disciplines recognized by the International Wushu Federation.

Hand Strikes
 Jab
 Cross
 Hook
 Overhand
 Uppercut
 Back-fist

Elbows and Knees
 Horizontal
 Vertical
 Diagonal

Kicks
 Front Thrusting Kick
 Front Snap Kick
 Side Kick
 Hook Kick
 Spinning Back Kick
 Roundhouse Kick
 Axe kick

Throws
 Hip Throw
 Shoulder Throw
 Sweep
 Double leg takedowns
 Single leg takedowns
 Body lock takedowns
 Kick catch throws
 Trips
Scissor takedown

One can see Sanda as a synthesis of traditional Chinese fighting techniques into a more amorphous system and is commonly taught alongside traditional Chinese styles, from which Wushu Sanda techniques, theory and training methods are derived. The emphasis of Sanda is on a more amorphous fighting ability.

Sport Variation
Yundong Sanda or Jinzheng Sanda: A modern fighting method, sport, and applicable component of Wushu / Kung Fu influenced by traditional Chinese Boxing, of which takedowns & throws are legal in competition, as well as all other sorts of striking (use of arms & legs). 
Chinese wrestling methods called Shuai Jiao and other Chinese grappling techniques such as Chin Na. It has all the combat aspects of wushu.

Sanda appears much like Kickboxing but includes many more grappling techniques. Sanda fighting competitions are often held alongside taolu or form competitions. Sanda represents the modern development of Lei Tai contests, but with rules in place to reduce the chance of serious injury. 
Many Chinese martial art schools teach or work within the rule sets of Sanda, working to incorporate the movements, characteristics, and theory of their style.

Chinese martial artists also compete in non-Chinese or mixed combat sports, including boxing, kickboxing and mixed martial arts. Sanda is practiced in tournaments and is normally held alongside taolu events in wushu competition. For safety reasons, some techniques from the self-defense form such as elbow strikes, chokes, and joint locks, are not allowed during tournaments. Competitors can win by knockout or points which are earned by landing strikes to the body or head, throwing an opponent, or when competition is held on a raised lei tai platform, pushing them off the platform. Fighters are only allowed to clinch for a few seconds. If the clinch is not broken by the fighters, and if neither succeeds in throwing his opponent within the time limit, the referee will break the clinch. In the U.S., competitions are held either in boxing rings or on the raised lei tai platform. Amateur fighters wear protective gear.

"Amateur Sanda" allows kicks, punches, knees (not to the head), and throws. A competition held in China, called the "King of Sanda", is held in a ring similar to a boxing ring in design but larger in dimension. As professionals, they wear no protective gear except for gloves, cup, and mouthpiece, and 
"Professional Sanda" allows knee strikes (including to the head) as well as kicking, punching and throwing.

Some Sanda fighters have participated in fighting tournaments such as K-1 and Shoot Boxing. They have had some degree of success, especially in Shoot boxing competitions, which is more similar to Sanda. Due to the rules of Kickboxing competition, Sanda fighters are subjected to more limitations than usual. Also notable competitors in China's mainstream Mixed Martial Arts competitions, Art of War Fighting Championship and Ranik Ultimate Fighting Federation are dominantly of wushu Sanda background. Sanda coach, Zhao Xuejun played a significant role in helping transition Sanda fighters to MMA. Although it is less common, some Sanda practitioners have also fought in American Mixed Martial Arts competitions such as the UFC and Strikeforce. Sanda has been featured in many style-versus-style competitions. Muay Thai is frequently pitted against Sanda as is Karate, Kickboxing, & Tae Kwon Do.

Military Variation
Junshi Sanda: A system of unarmed combat that was designed by Chinese Elite Forces based upon their intense study of traditional martial arts such as traditional Kung Fu, Shuai Jiao, Chin Na and modern hand-to-hand fighting and combat philosophy to develop a realistic system of unarmed fighting for the Chinese military. Junshi Sanda employs all parts of the body as anatomical weapons to attack and counter with, by using what the Chinese consider to be the four basic martial arts techniques:
 Da – Upper-Body Striking – using fists, open hands, fingers, elbows, shoulders, forearms and the head
 Ti – Lower-Body Striking – including kicks, knees and stomping
 Shuai – Throws – using Wrestling and Judo-like takedowns and sweeps, and
 Chin-Na – Seizing – which includes jointlocks, strangulation and other submissions

Competitions
The International Wushu Federation (IWUF) promotes wushu and is the governing body for wushu in all its forms worldwide. Sanda and taolu (forms) are the two categories of competitive sport wushu . The IWUF is recognized by the International Olympic Committee (IOC).

World Wushu Championships

Sanda World Cup

Notable Practitioners

Sanda

 Liu Hailong
 Kong Hongxing
 Bao Ligao
 Zhang Kaiyin
 Hossein Ojaghi
 Hamid Reza Gholipour
 Mohsen Mohammadseifi
 Erfan Ahangarian
 Khadijeh Azadpour
 Shahrbanoo Mansourian
 Elaheh Mansourian
 Hüseyin Dündar
 Gülşah Kıyak
 Mohammed Al-Ashwal

Kickboxing

 Fang Bian
 Wei Rui
 Daniel Ghiță
 Cătălin Zmărăndescu
 Andrei Stoica
 Bogdan Stoica
 Dong Wenfei
 Jia Aoqi
 Yang Zhuo
 Bai Jinbin
 Zhu Shuai
 Xu Yan  
 Xie Lei
 Jin Ying
 Qiu Jianliang
 Dave Leduc
 Wang Cong
 Zheng Junfeng
 E Meidie
 Wang Kehan

Mixed martial arts

 Zhang Weili
 Cung Le 
 Eduard Folayang 
 Joshua Pacio
 Kevin Belingon
 Muslim Salikhov
 Zabit Magomedsharipov
 Bozigit Ataev
 Karimula Barkalaev
 Karl Albrektsson
 Shamil Abdurakhimov
 Song Yadong    
 Pat Barry
 K.J. Noons
 Alessio Sakara
 Mark Eddiva
 Song Kenan
 Li Jingliang 
 Yan Xiaonan 
 Su Mudaerji

Professional boxing
 Alessandro Riguccini

See also
 Kickboxing 
 Folk wrestling
 Kumite
 Shoot boxing
 Sambo
 Muay Thai 
 Lethwei
Pradal

References

External links

International Wushu Federation official Website
ICMAC - Official ISKA Sanctioned Sanda & Kung Fu Tournaments Worldwide
International Kickboxing Federation - IKF - official website - Sanshou Competition Rules

Chinese martial arts
Combat sports
Hybrid martial arts
Mixed martial arts styles
Events in wushu
Sports originating in China